Mukhtar Omar Othman Fallatah (born 15 October 1987) is a Saudi Arabian footballer who plays for Al-Hedaya as a striker former the Saudi Arabia national team.

Club career

Al-Wehda
Mukhtar Fallatah started his professional career at Al-Wehda. He made 61 appearances and scored 17 goals during his three seasons with the first team. He helped the club reach the final of the 2010–11 Crown Prince Cup.

Al-Shabab
Following Al-Wehda's relegation, Fallatah joined Al-Shabab for a reported fee of SAR5.5 million. In his first season at the club, Fallatah helped Al-Shabab win the league title as he made 20 league appearances and scored four times. In his second season, Fallatah failed to nail down a spot in the starting 11 and left the club mid-season.

Al-Ittihad
On 14 January 2013, Fallatah joined Al-Ittihad on a three and a half year contract. In his first season, Fallatah played a crucial role as Al-Ittihad won the King Cup. He scored four times including once in the final against former club Al-Shabab. His good form continued to the next season as Fallatah scored 32 goals in all competitions. His good form earned him a call-up to the national team for the first time since 2012. Fallatah left Al-Ittihad following the expiry of his contract.

Return to Al-Wehda
On 14 July 2016, Fallatah returned to Al-Wehda on a free transfer. He signed a three-year contract with the club. He scored 16 goals in 23 appearances in the league; however, his efforts were not enough to prevent Al-Wehda's relegation to the First Division.

Al-Hilal
On 4 June 2017, Fallatah joined Al-Hilal on a free transfer. He scored his first goal for Al-Hilal in the 1–1 draw against former club Al-Ittihad. Fallatah made seven appearances and scored twice as Al-Hilal won the league title. In his second season, Fallatah made just one appearance for the club. He was released from his contract on 17 January 2019.

Al-Qadsiah
On 19 January 2019, Fallatah joined Al-Qadsiah on a six-month contract. He made seven appearances and failed to score as Al-Qadsiah were relegated at the end of the season.

Al-Shoulla
After nine months without a club, Fallatah joined MS League side Al-Shoulla on 31 January 2020. He signed a 6-month contract with the club.

Career statistics

Club

International
Source:

International goals
Scores and results list Saudi Arabia's goal tally first.

Honors

Club

Al Shabab
 Saudi Professional League: 2011–12

Al Ittihad
 Kings Cup: 2013

Al Hilal
 Saudi Professional League: 2017–18
 Saudi Super Cup: 2018

References

External links
 

Living people
1987 births
Saudi Arabian footballers
Saudi Arabia international footballers
Association football forwards
Al-Wehda Club (Mecca) players
Al-Shabab FC (Riyadh) players
Ittihad FC players
Al Hilal SFC players
Al-Qadsiah FC players
Al-Shoulla FC players
Jeddah Club players
Al-Tai FC players
Al-Jubail Club players
Al-Hedaya Club players
Saudi Professional League players
Saudi First Division League players
Saudi Third Division players
Saudi Fourth Division players